Pisgah is an unincorporated community in Woodford County, in the U.S. state of Kentucky.

History
The first settlement at Pisgah was made in 1784 by a colony from Virginia. The community's name is derived from Mount Pisgah, a mountain mentioned in the Hebrew Bible. Pisgah Presbyterian Church, a local landmark, was founded in 1784. The current building dates from 1812.

The railroad was extended to Pisgah in 1888. A post office called Pisgah was established in 1890, and remained in operation until 1931.

References

Unincorporated communities in Woodford County, Kentucky
Unincorporated communities in Kentucky